Fedosikha is a rural locality (a village) in Ustretskoye Rural Settlement, Syamzhensky District, Vologda Oblast, Russia. The population was 26 as of 2002.

Geography 
Fedosikha is located 27 km west of Syamzha (the district's administrative centre) by road. Burdukovo is the nearest rural locality.

References 

Rural localities in Syamzhensky District